The Dominion District includes public schools from the Greater Richmond Region. Dominion District schools compete in the 6A, 5A, 4A, and 3A divisions.

The Dominion District schools are located in the central part of the Greater Richmond Region south of the James River, which includes schools in Chesterfield County, Richmond City, and Powhatan County.

Member schools
Lloyd C. Bird High School of Chesterfield
Clover Hill High School of Midlothian
Cosby High School of Midlothian
Huguenot High School of Richmond
James River High School of Midlothian
Manchester High School of Midlothian
Midlothian High School of Midlothian
Monacan High School of North Chesterfield
George Wythe High School of Richmond
Powhatan High School of Powhatan

External links

Virginia High School League